Ibrahim Mitwalli (born 13 February 1938) is a Sudanese weightlifter. He competed in the men's lightweight event at the 1960 Summer Olympics.

References

1938 births
Living people
Sudanese male weightlifters
Olympic weightlifters of Sudan
Weightlifters at the 1960 Summer Olympics
People from Khartoum